The year 1804 in architecture involved some significant events.

Buildings and structures

Buildings

 May 21 – Père Lachaise Cemetery in Paris, laid out by Alexandre-Théodore Brongniart, is opened.
 August 28 – Cathedral of the Holy Trinity (Quebec), designed by Major William Robe and Captain William Hall, is consecrated.
 The Government House in the Bahamas is completed.
 Montevideo Metropolitan Cathedral in Uruguay is consecrated.
 Dalongdong Baoan Temple in Taipei, Taiwan, is completed.
 The Pont des Arts in Paris, designed by Louis-Alexandre de Cessart and Jacques Dillon, is completed.
 Rostokino Aqueduct for Moscow water supply is completed by Colonel Ivan Gerard to the designs of Friedrich Wilhelm Bauer.

Awards
 Grand Prix de Rome, architecture: Jules Lesueur.

Births
 February 7 – William Tinsley, Irish architect working in the United States (died 1885)
 March 1 – John Henderson, Scottish ecclesiastical architect (died 1862)
 March 13 – Thomas Allom, English architect (died 1872)
 September 4 – Thomas Ustick Walter, American architect (died 1887)
 November 3 – Alexander Dick Gough, English architect (died 1871)
 December 19 – George Townsend Andrews, English architect known for railway stations in Yorkshire (died 1855)
 John S. Norris, American architect (died 1876)

Deaths
 March 18 – Louis Jean Desprez, French painter and architect working in Sweden (born 1743)
 Nicholas Revett, English amateur architect (born 1720)

References

Architecture
Years in architecture
19th-century architecture